

Tunnels

See also
 List of bridges of Pittsburgh

References

Tunnels in Pennsylvania
Tunnels
Pittsburgh